Almafuerte is a genus of South American ground spiders first described by C. J. Grismado & N. L. Carrión in 2017.

Species
 it contains seven species:
Almafuerte facon Grismado & Carrión, 2017 — Bolivia
Almafuerte giaii (Gerschman & Schiapelli, 1948) — Argentina
Almafuerte goloboffi Grismado & Carrión, 2017 — Argentina
Almafuerte kuru Grismado & Carrión, 2017 — Argentina
Almafuerte peripampasica Grismado & Carrión, 2017 — Argentina, Uruguay
Almafuerte remota Grismado & Carrión, 2017 — Argentina
Almafuerte vigorosa Grismado & Carrión, 2017 — Argentina

References

Araneomorphae genera
Gnaphosidae